Stanley Tshoshane is a Batswana football manager.

He was appointed to the position of Botswana manager in 2008, following a short spell as caretaker manager. He was sacked in October 2013.

Critics suggested he was only offered the job because the Botswana Football Association could not afford to hire a better reputed "name".

Previously he had been assistant to English manager Colwyn Rowe for the national team.

Whilst working as an assistant for the national, he had also been manager of the Botswana Defence Force's football team BDF XI.

As a player, he had also played for BDF XI

Prior to his spell at BDF XI, he had been the manager of the national team previously in 2002.

References

Living people
1957 births
Botswana football managers
Botswana national football team managers
2012 Africa Cup of Nations managers